The meaning of the word crypto as an abbreviation is controversial. Cryptographers - people who specialize in cryptography - have used the term "crypto" as an abbreviation for their field of study. However, "crypto" has also become a common abbreviation for cryptocurrency.

Etymologies and definitions 

The word cryptography derives from the prefix "crypto-" of Greek origin meaning "hidden" and the suffix "-graph" also of Greek origin and meaning "to write". This name reflects cryptography's historical role as the study of codes for secret communication. Still, the prefix crypto appears in many other words, such as cryptofascism (secret support for fascism), cryptosporidium (a parasite), and cryptomnesia (a long-forgotten memory).

The term "cryptography" nowadays refers to an effervescent area of research that has moved beyond secret ciphers to study message authentication, digital signatures, secure multiparty computation and zero-knowledge proofs, among other active areas of research. 

Cryptocurrencies, on the other hand, are currencies that use cryptography as an underlying mechanism. Nevertheless, most cryptocurrencies only use digital signatures and hash functions.

Usages 
Dictionaries such as Merriam-Webster and the Oxford English Dictionary, define "crypto" as a shorthand for cryptography.

Matt Blaze registered the domain crypto.com in 1993, but sold the domain in 2018 to a cryptocurrency company. In 2021, the Staples Center in Los Angeles was renamed to the Crypto.com Arena, referring to the cryptocurrency company now behind the domain.

Descriptivism, as opposed to prescriptivism, is the school of thought that accepts crypto as referring to cryptocurrency rather than cryptography based on the common use of the term.

Controversy 
Computer scientist Matthew D. Green stated that most cryptocurrencies barely have anything to do with serious cryptography, aside from trivial use of digital signatures and hash functions.

Matt Blaze stated in 2018 that "I think calling cryptocurrencies 'crypto' is a poor choice, with bad consequences for both cryptography and cryptocurrencies". 

Parker Higgins of the Freedom of the Press Foundation stated that the cryptography crowd is by nature deeply invested in precision. 

Journalist Lorenzo Franceschi-Bicchierai from Vice compared the controversy to the meaning of the word "hacker", which can used for criminals and curious technology enthausiast as part of the hacker culture. 

The website cryptoisnotcryptocurrency.com features the statement "‘Crypto’ does not mean cryptocurrency, it means cryptography." on a red background and with an emoticon expressing incredulity.

Amie Stepanovich, the executive director of the Silicon Flatirons center at the University of Colorado, created T-shirts bearing the message: "Crypto. It means cryptography." This shirt is popular among cybersecurity experts; it was, for example, worn by Matt Blaze.

References

External links 
 cryptoisnotcryptocurrency.com

Cryptography
Cryptocurrencies
Naming controversies